Turtle Island Light is a deactivated lighthouse located on Turtle Island in Lake Erie.  The small island is divided between the U.S. states of Michigan and Ohio, with the abandoned lighthouse structure located within Ohio.

When Turtle Island fell back to federal ownership, the newly established Port of Toledo received $5,000 of federal funding from the United States Congress to build the lighthouse in 1831.

Unlike most islands in Lake Erie, Turtle Island consists primarily of clay and gravel deposits and was subjected to constant erosion, which is why some believed it to not be a real island. By 1839, lake storms and waves reduced the island by approximately 77% down to an area of only . Congress spent tens of thousands of dollars to no avail to prevent the erosion of the island. In 1866, an updated lighthouse costing $12,000 was constructed. Constant lake storms bombarded the tiny island. When the nearby Toledo Harbor Light was completed in 1904, the Turtle Island Lighthouse was no longer needed and was decommissioned. During those 72 years, there were no shipwrecks within the vicinity of Turtle Island.

There were two keepers of the lighthouse: Ann Edson (1869–1870) and William Haynes (1875–1904).

References

Further reading
 Gardner, B. Ellen. Turtle Island Lighthouse: The Darkened Light.  Cornwall, New York: Hawk's Cry Publications, 1997. 
 Oleszewski, Wes. Great Lakes Lighthouses, American and Canadian: A Comprehensive Directory/Guide to Great Lakes Lighthouses. Gwinn, Michigan: Avery Color Studios, Inc., 1998. .
 Turtle Island Light Station, The Keepers' Log, Notice to Keepers Volume 10, Issue 4, Page 40.
 U.S. Coast Guard. Historically Famous Lighthouses. Washington, D.C.: Government Printing Office, 1957.
 Wright, Larry and Wright, Patricia. Great Lakes Lighthouses Encyclopedia. Erin, Ontario: Boston Mills Press, 2006.

External links
 
Turtle Island Lighthouse at Lighthouse Friends
Lighthouse Depot: Turtle Island.

Lighthouses completed in 1831
Lighthouses completed in 1866
Lighthouses in Ohio
Buildings and structures in Lucas County, Ohio
1831 establishments in Michigan Territory